Alford is an unincorporated community in Washington Township, Pike County, in the U.S. state of Indiana.

History
Alford was laid out in 1856 by Samuel Alfords, and named for him.

Geography

References

Unincorporated communities in Indiana
Unincorporated communities in Pike County, Indiana